USNS Joshua Humphreys (T-AO-188) is a  of the United States Navy.  She was named for Joshua Humphreys, who designed the six original US Navy frigates. She entered service in 1987 and was placed in reserve just nine years later, but has twice been brought out of reserve and as of 2015 is once more on active duty.

Construction and delivery
Joshua Humphreys, the second ship of the Henry J. Kaiser class, was specially built for the Military Sealift Command (MSC). She was laid down at Avondale Shipyard, Inc., at New Orleans, Louisiana, on 17 December 1984 and launched on 22 February 1986. She entered non-commissioned US Navy service with a primarily civilian crew on 3 April 1987.

Service history

1980s-1990s
Joshua Humphreys served in the United States Atlantic Fleet under MSC control until taken out of active service on 29 June 1996, the second ship of her class to be deactivated.  She was subsequently berthed at the Naval Inactive Ship Maintenance Facility (NISMF) at the site of the former Philadelphia Navy Yard in Philadelphia, Pennsylvania, and placed in reserve.

2000s
Joshua Humphreys was reactivated on 23 February 2005. She was deactivated again on 1 October 2006, and again placed in reserve at the Philadelphia facility, where she was moored in the Delaware River.

2010s
In March 2010 Atlantic Marine in Philadelphia was awarded a $12.8 million contract for the reactivation of the Joshua Humphreys.
Upon reactivation, she joined the US Fifth Fleet in support of counter-piracy and counter-terrorism operations in the Indian Ocean and Gulf area.  As 11 November 2010 she was providing fuel to the  Carrier Strike Group.

Gallery

References

External links

 NavSource Online: Service Ship Photo Archive: USNS Joshua Humphreys (T-AO-188)

 

Joshua Humphreys
Cold War auxiliary ships of the United States
Ships built in Bridge City, Louisiana
1986 ships